Bruce Stevenson (born 8 August 1949) is a former Australian rules footballer who played with Hawthorn Football Club in the Victorian Football League (VFL) and Central District and West Adelaide Football Clubs in the South Australian National Football League (SANFL).

Recruited from Swinburne Tech, Stevenson debuted in 1969 for Hawthorn and was a premiership player for Hawthorn in 1971, teaming well with Don Scott in the ruck.

Stevenson was a Hawthorn board member from 2012 until he resigned in 2017.

References

External links

1949 births
Living people
Australian rules footballers from Melbourne
Hawthorn Football Club players
Hawthorn Football Club Premiership players
Hawthorn Football Club administrators
Central District Football Club players
West Adelaide Football Club players
One-time VFL/AFL Premiership players
People from Kew, Victoria